Willy Zeyn may refer to:

 Willy Zeyn (director) (1876–1946), German film director
 Willy Zeyn (editor) (1907–1983), his son, German film editor and producer